Erik Kržišnik (born 8 March 1974) is a retired footballer who played as a defender for clubs in Slovenia and Greece.

Club career
Kržišnik began playing football with ND Slovan in the Slovenian first division. He would play for several other first division clubs, including NK Olimpija Ljubljana, HIT Gorica, NK Primorje, NK Domžale and ND Triglav Kranj.

Kržišnik moved to Greece in July 2002, where he would play for Greek first division sides PAS Giannina F.C. and Akratitos F.C. He made 33 appearances in the Greek top flight.

References

External links
Profile at Prvaliga.si

1974 births
Living people
Slovenian footballers
NK Olimpija Ljubljana (1945–2005) players
ND Gorica players
NK Primorje players
NK Domžale players
PAS Giannina F.C. players
A.P.O. Akratitos Ano Liosia players
Association football defenders